Princess Charming may refer to:
 Princess Charming (operetta), an operetta by Albert Szirmai
 Princess Charming (film), a 1934 British musical comedy film, based on the operetta
 Princess Charming (Philippine TV series), a 2007 Philippine television drama series
 Princess Charming (German TV series), a 2021 German reality dating show
 "Princess Charming", a song by Pussy Riot from Matriarchy Now

See also
 Prince Charming (disambiguation)